John Cunningham, 15th Earl of Glencairn (1749 – 24 September 1796) was a Scottish nobleman, cavalry officer, and finally a priest.

The younger son of William Cunningham, 13th Earl of Glencairn (d. 1775) he succeeded his elder brother James, one of Scotland's Representative Peers, upon his death, unmarried, in Falmouth in 1790.

For some time Lord John Cunningham was an officer in the 14th Royal Dragoons, but afterwards entered into Holy Orders of the Church of England.

He died at Coats House, then west of the city of Edinburgh (now absorbed), in his 47th year.

In 1785 he had married Isabel, daughter of Henry David Erskine, 10th Earl of Buchan (d. 1767), and widow of William Leslie Hamilton. They had no issue and the title became dormant.

He is buried against the south-west wall in St Cuthberts Churchyard in Edinburgh.

References
 Brown, Peter, publisher, The Peerage of Scotland, Edinburgh, 1834, p. 88.
 Anderson, William, The Scottish Nation, Edinburgh, 1867, vol.v, p. 313.

1749 births
1796 deaths
Scottish soldiers
18th-century Scottish Episcopalian priests
Earl of Glencairn